Neele Eckhardt-Noack (born 2 July 1992) is a German triple jumper. She competed in the women's triple jump at the 2017 World Championships in Athletics.

International competitions

References

External links

 

1992 births
Living people
German female triple jumpers
World Athletics Championships athletes for Germany
Place of birth missing (living people)
Universiade medalists in athletics (track and field)
Universiade gold medalists for Germany
Medalists at the 2017 Summer Universiade
Athletes (track and field) at the 2020 Summer Olympics
Olympic athletes of Germany